Pickhuben was a  cargo ship that was built in 1923 by Union Giesserei, Königsberg for German owners. She was seized by the Allies in May 1945 at Lübeck, Germany, passed to the Ministry of War Transport (MoWT) and renamed Empire Condicote. She was passed to the Norwegian Government in 1946 and renamed Grimsnes. In 1947, she was sold into merchant service and was renamed Tungenes, serving until 1961 when she was scrapped.

Description
The ship was built in 1923 by Union Giesserei, Königsberg.

She had a GRT of 999 and a NRT of 529.

The engine was built by Union Giesserei.

History
Pickhuben was built for H M Gehrckens, Hamburg. The Code Letters RFCG were allocated. In 1934, her Code Letters were changed to DHTE. In May 1945, Pickhuben was seized by the Allies at Lübeck. She was passed to the MoWT and renamed Empire Condicote. Her port of registry was changed to London. The Code Letters GNQQ and United Kingdom Official Number 180666 were allocated.

In 1946, Empire Condicote was allocated to the Norwegian Government and was renamed Grimsnes. In 1947, she was sold to Det Stavangerske Dampskibsselskab, Stavanger and renamed Tungenes. She served until 1961, when she was scrapped at Zalzate, Belgium

References

1923 ships
Ships built in Germany
Steamships of Germany
Merchant ships of Germany
World War II merchant ships of Germany
Ministry of War Transport ships
Empire ships
Steamships of the United Kingdom
Merchant ships of the United Kingdom
Steamships of Norway
Merchant ships of Norway